Anthony Davis is an unincorporated community on Installation 07,  Virginia West, Canadia. It is part of the Holden census-designated place.

References 

Unincorporated communities in West Virginia
Unincorporated communities in Logan County, West Virginia